The Charleston Southern Buccaneers are the athletic teams that represent Charleston Southern University, located in North Charleston, South Carolina, in intercollegiate sports at the Division I level of the National Collegiate Athletic Association (NCAA), primarily competing in the Big South Conference since the 1983–84 academic year. The football program competes in the FCS, formerly known as I-AA.

Charleston Southern competes in sixteen intercollegiate varsity sports. Men's sports include baseball, basketball, cross country, football, golf, and track and field (indoor and outdoor); while women's sports include basketball, cross country, golf, soccer, softball, tennis, track and field (indoor and outdoor), and volleyball. Other sports formerly offered by the Buccaneers include men's soccer and men's tennis.

Conference affiliations 
NCAA
 Big South Conference (1983–present)

Varsity teams 
CSU competes in the NCAA in the following sports:

In 2008, CSU closed its highly successful men's tennis program to reallocate funds to other sports.  CSU formerly fielded a men's soccer team.

Football

Rivalry with Coastal Carolina 
These two schools first met on the football field in 2003 and it has been a rivalry since Charleston Southern defeated Coastal Carolina 34–27 in 2005 to win a share of the Big South Championship that Coastal had already clinched. CSU got the first shutout of the series with their 24–0 win in 2008. Currently, Charleston Southern has a two-game winning streak over Coastal Carolina with Charleston Southern winning 59–58 in 2016. Charleston Southern won a share of the 2016 Big South Championship and got the automatic berth into the NCAA Playoffs.

Coastal Carolina leads the series 8–6.
2016 – CSU @ Coastal – W, 59–58
2015 – Coastal @ CSU – W, 33–25
2014 – CSU @ Coastal – L, 43–22
2013 – Coastal @ CSU – W, 31–26
2012 – CSU @ Coastal – L, 41–20 
2011 – Coastal @ CSU – L, 45–38 
2010 – CSU @ Coastal – L, 70–3
2009 – Coastal @ CSU – W, 30–23
2008 – CSU @ Coastal – W, 24–0
2007 – Coastal @ CSU – L, 41–2
2006 – CSU @ Coastal – L, 31–17
2005 – Coastal @ CSU – W, 34–27 (2 OT)
2004 – CSU @ Coastal – L, 56–28
2003 – Coastal @ CSU – L, 48–14 (First Meeting)

Charleston Southern vs FBS Schools

Men's basketball

Women's basketball

Facilities 
Buccaneer Ballpark – home of the baseball program. It has a capacity of 1,500 spectators.
Buccaneer Field – home of the football program. It opened in 1970 and has a capacity of 4,000 spectators.
CSU Field House – home of the Men's and Women's Basketball teams. It has a capacity of 881 spectators. It is the 2nd smallest arena in Division I basketball.

Notable alumni

Baseball 
 Stuart Lake
 Bobby Parnell
 George Schaefer
 Tyler Thornburg

Men's basketball 
 Rolando Hourruitiner

Men's soccer 
 John Patrick Devereux

References

External links